This is a list of Indonesian prisoners and detainees:
 Abdul Aziz Imam Samudra
 Bali Nine
 Abu Bakar Bashir
 Andrew Chan
 Si Yi Chen
 Schapelle Corby
 Michael Czugaj
 Riduan Isamuddin
 Renae Lawrence
 Tan Duc Thanh Nguyen
 Matthew Norman
 Amrozi bin Nurhasyim
 Scott Rush
 Martin Stephens
 Tommy Suharto
 Myuran Sukumaran

Prisoners and detainees